The National Zoological Museum of China is located on the campus of the Chinese Academy of Sciences in Beijing in the Chaoyang District. It is the largest zoological museum in China. It has three floors of exhibits that surround a central exhibit area that contains a large hanging whale skeleton. The exhibits consists largely of mounted bird, mammal, and insects. The butterfly collection is quite large in particular.

See also
Kunming Institute of Zoology

References

External links
National Zoological Museum of China Official site 
Science Museums of China at kepu.net.cn 

Museums in Beijing
Natural history museums in China
2009 establishments in China